Tai Poutini Polytechnic (TPP) provides tertiary education aimed to meet the needs of West Coast students and businesses. TPP's West Coast programmes include, among others, tourism and hospitality training across the retail and service sector, outdoor education training, agriculture, extractive/mining, and specialist jade and hard stone carving programmes.

Established in 1989, the Polytechnic now trains around 6,000 students every year in full or part-time study options. TPP's aim is to get their students into jobs in the local community, so they work with industry partners and local employers to ensure the training is suited to the needs of the West Coast. Training is provided local campuses in Greymouth and Westport, with on-site training at various locations across the region to ensure the students face real world work requirements.

In addition to their West Coast-based programmes, TPP also offers a range of national niche programmes at sites from Wanaka to Auckland, including: 
emergency management and search and rescue training through our Emergency Management Department;
industry training including scaffolding, industrial ropes, rigging, and cranes;
civil construction industry training;
ski patrol training based in Wanaka.

On 1 April 2020, Tai Poutini Polytechnic was subsumed into New Zealand Institute of Skills & Technology alongside the 15 other Institutes of Technology and Polytechnics (ITPs).

Programmes
Tai Poutini offers a range of mainstream and specialist programmes. Specialist outdoor education programmes, including ski patrol, are located in the South Island. The polytechnic's one and two year jade carving programmes are unique to New Zealand, and are situated near the source of West Coast jade.

Study options:

References

External links
Official website

Te Pūkenga – New Zealand Institute of Skills and Technology
Education in the West Coast, New Zealand
Greymouth
2020 disestablishments in New Zealand